Trizalis, is a Greek folk dance from Crete, Greece, similar to Pidikhtos and is very widespread in the Greek islands. It is also called "Κουρουθιανός" (Kourouthianos).

See also
Music of Greece
Greek dances

References
Ελληνικοί παραδοσιακοί χοροί: Τριζάλης

Greek dances